Clathrus baumii is a species of fungus in the stinkhorn family. It was named by Paul Christoph Hennings in 1903, based on specimens found in Angola in 1899.

References

Phallales
Fungi of Africa
Fungi described in 1933